The Brava Island Opening Tournament (Portuguese: Torneio de Abertura da Brava, Capeverdean Crioulo, ALUPEC or ALUPEK: Turnéu di Abertura da Braba), is an opening tournament competition (equivalent to a league cup) played during the season in the island of Brava, Cape Verde  The competition is organized by the Brava Regional Football Association (Associação Regional de Futebol da Brava, ARFB).  Some seasons featured rounds of one portion, some seasons featured three rounds and two groups with the top club of each group in the final match.  It currently consists of six rounds, a meeting with another club once.  The winner with the most points (sometimes in the final) is the winner.

Recently Sporting Brava won four straight titles for 2017 and is the current winner.

The opening tournament were cancelled in 2011 (along with other sports competitions) and in 2015.

Winners

See also
Brava Island League
Brava Island Cup
Brava Island Super Cup

References

Sport in Brava, Cape Verde
Football cup competitions in Cape Verde
2001 establishments in Cape Verde